Joris Van Hauthem (29 November 1963 – 25 March 2015) was a Belgian politician who was floor leader in the Belgian Senate for the Flemish movement Vlaams Belang party. He was born in Anderlecht, Brussels and lived  in Lennik. He died at home on 25 March 2015 due to cancer.

He had a degree in modern history.

Political functions
 member of the Brussels-Capital Council (1989–1995)
 Federal Representative for the electoral district Brussels-Halle-Vilvoorde (1991–1995)
 Flemish Representative for the electoral district Brussels-Halle-Vilvoorde (1995–)
 municipal councillor of Lennik (2001–)
 Community senator (1995–)

He has served as one of three vice-presidents of the Senate.

Notes

1963 births
2015 deaths
Vlaams Belang politicians
Members of the Belgian Federal Parliament
People from Anderlecht
21st-century Belgian politicians